Tears Were Falling is a 1982 Soviet fantasy film directed by Georgiy Daneliya. The plot can be viewed as a modern interpretation of the fairy tale by Hans Christian Andersen The Snow Queen. It was the last film role of actor Boris Andreyev.

Plot 
The plot of the story is the same as in the fairy tale by Hans Christian Andersen. An evil troll creates a magic mirror that reflects and exaggerates everything bad and evil. The mirror shatters, and one of its millions of fragments falls into the eyes Pavel Ivanovich Vasin, a resident of the small town of Zarechensk.

Ordinarily a balanced person, respectable family man, and helpful neighbor and colleague, Vasin changes beyond recognition. He sees only the worst in his friends and relatives and no redeeming traits. Vasin kicks his son out of the household, quarrels with his wife, hurls verbal abuse at his colleagues at work, and even goes so far as to attempt suicide.

Cast
 Yevgeny Leonov as Pavel Ivanovich Vasin
 Iya Savvina as Irina, Vasin's wife
 Nina Grebeshkova as Zinaida Galkina
 Aleksandra Yakovleva as Lyusya
 Boryslav Brondukov as Fyodor, alcoholic
 Boris Andreyev as Nikolai Vanichkin
 Pyotr Shcherbakov as Sklyansky  
 Nina Ruslanova as Dina
 Andrei Tolubeyev as Tolik
 Georgiy Daneliya as a passenger on the tram (uncredited)

Production and release
The working title of the film was Gladiator.

The film was shot in Kaluga, Rostov, Ashgabat, and Odessa.

The film was banned from screening abroad, six months lay on the shelf, and then was released in a limited release.

References

External links

 Tears Were Falling at the KinoPoisk

1982 films
Films directed by Georgiy Daneliya
Films based on works by Kir Bulychov
Mosfilm films
1980s Russian-language films
Soviet fantasy drama films
1980s fantasy drama films
1982 drama films